Edna Mae Cooper (July 19, 1900 – June 27, 1986) was an American actress of the silent era. She appeared in 79 films between 1911 and 1927.

Early life 
On July 19, 1900, Cooper was born in Baltimore, Maryland.

Career 
Cooper is known for her performances in Men, Women, and Money (1919), Grounds for Divorce (1925), and The Ten Commandments (1956).

Bobbi Trout asked starlet Edna Mae Cooper if she wanted to go with her to attempt another endurance run. They first attempted the flight on January 1, 1931 but due to technical problems they had to abort the flight. At their next attempt, they were successful in flying straight for 122 hours and 50 minutes, only to end the run on January 9, 1931 due to the spitting off fuel. This was another record broken by Trout, and was later recognized by King Carol II of Romania, who representative gave her the Royal Decree and the aviation cross for pilots who made record flights, a distinction only given to two other pilots - Amelia Earhart and Charles Lindbergh.

Filmography
 1918 Rimrock Jones - Hazel Hardesty
 1918 The Whispering Chorus - Good Face
 1918 Old Wives for New - Bertha
 1918 Sauce for the Goose - Mrs. Edith Darch
 1919 You Never Saw Such a Girl - Mrs. McKenzie
 1919 Putting It Over 
 1919 Men, Women, and Money - Miss Cote
 1919 The Third Kiss - Gwendolin Finn
 1919 Male and Female - Fisher
 1919 Peg o' My Heart
 1920 Why Change Your Wife?  - Gordon's Maid
 1924 The Folly of Vanity  - Russian Vamp (modern sequence)
 1925 Beauty and the Bad Man  - Mayme
 1925 Grounds for Divorce  - Marie
 1925 Sally, Irene and Mary  - Maggie
Scotty of the Scouts (1926) - Effie Middleton
The King of Kings (1927) - (uncredited)
The Swim Princess (1928, Short) - Swimming Coach
The Blue Danube (1928)
Speedy (1928) - Minor Role (uncredited)
Say It with Sables (1928) - Maid
Code of the Air (1928)
The Apache (1928) - Minor Role (uncredited)
George Washington Cohen (1928)
Foolish Husbands (1929, Short) - Committee Woman
Don't Get Jealous (1929, Short) - Mrs. Blake
The Ten Commandments (1956) - Woman of the Court (final film role)

Personal life 
Copper's husband was Karl Brown, a cinematopher, screenwriter, and director. On June 27, 1986, Cooper died a month before her 86th birthday in Woodland Hills neighborhood of Los Angeles, California, U.S..

Cooper is interned at Forest Lawn Memorial Park (Hollywood Hills) in Los Angeles, California.

References

External links

American silent film actresses
20th-century American actresses
1900 births
1986 deaths
Burials at Forest Lawn Memorial Park (Hollywood Hills)